A Day at the Races is a DVD released by Welsh rock band Stereophonics. It was released on 27 May 2002. The DVD features live recordings from a concert at the Millennium Stadium from 21 July 2001.

Track listing 

Stereophonics video albums
V2 Records video albums
2002 video albums
Live video albums
2002 live albums